Adolph Alexander Weinman (December 11, 1870 – August 8, 1952) was a German-born American sculptor and architectural sculptor.

Early life and education

Adolph Alexander Weinman was born in Durmersheim, near Karlsruhe, Germany. He immigrated to the United States in 1885 at the age of 14. At the age of 15, he attended evening classes at Cooper Union and later studied at the Art Students League of New York with sculptors Augustus Saint-Gaudens and Philip Martiny.

Career
He worked as an assistant to the sculptors Charles Niehaus, Olin Warner, and Daniel Chester French before opening his own studio in 1904. Although Weinman is now best remembered as a medalist, he considered himself to be an architectural sculptor. His steadiest income was derived from the sale of small bronze reproductions of his larger works, such as Descending Night, originally commissioned for the Panama–Pacific International Exposition, San Francisco, 1915.

Weinman was a member of the National Sculpture Society and served as its president from 1927 to 1930. His work was also part of the sculpture event in the art competition at the 1928 Summer Olympics. He served on the U.S. Commission of Fine Arts from 1929 to 1933.  He was also a member of the American Academy of Arts and Letters, the National Institute of Arts and Letters, the National Academy of Design, and the New York City Art Commission, among other organizations.

Death
Weinman died in Port Chester, New York, on August 8, 1952. Following a mass at Manhattan's St. Patrick's Cathedral, he was buried at Calvary Cemetery in Queens. Weinman's papers are at the Smithsonian Archives of American Art.

His son Robert Weinman was also a sculptor. His son Howard Weinman designed the Long Island Tercentenary half dollar commemorative coin.

Works

Despite his objections, Weinman is still best remembered as the designer of the Walking Liberty Half Dollar, a design now used for the obverse of the American Silver Eagle one-ounce bullion coin, and the "Mercury" dime along with various medals for the Armed Services of the United States. Among these are the identical reverses of the Asiatic-Pacific Campaign Medal, the European-African-Middle Eastern Campaign Medal, and the American Campaign Medal. Weinman was one of many sculptors and artists who employed Audrey Munson as a model.

Weinman's work as an architectural sculptor can be found on the Wisconsin, Missouri, and Louisiana state capitols. He became the sculptor of choice for the  architecture firm McKim, Mead, and White and designed sculpture for their Manhattan Municipal Building, Madison Square Presbyterian Church (completed 1906 and demolished 1919), Prison Ship Martyrs' Monument, and Pennsylvania Railroad Station (completed 1910 and demolished 1963), all in New York City. A photograph of one of his angels, Day, in a landfill in New Jersey is one of the saddest reminders of the destruction of Penn Station in 1963, but two of his eagles were retained as trophies outside the entrance to the new subterranean Penn Station.  Elsewhere he created the dramatic frieze on the Elks National Veterans Memorial in Chicago and executed sculpture for the Post Office Department Building, the Jefferson Memorial, and the interior of the U.S. Supreme Court, all in Washington, D.C.

Weinman's non-architectural works include the Macomb and the Maybury monuments in Detroit. Another example of his non-architectural work is his Abraham Lincoln Statue (Kentucky) located in the center of Hodgenville, Kentucky.

Weinman was one of 250 sculptors who exhibited in the 3rd Sculpture International held at the Philadelphia Museum of Art in the summer of 1949.

Weinman's works are mostly executed in a lyrical neoclassical style. His figures typically wear classical drapery, but there is a fluidity found in his work that is a harbinger of the Art Deco style that was to follow him. His bronze statuette The Nude Golfer epitomizes this style. This work evokes classical sculpture in its  attention to anatomy and movement and the nude status of the athlete while the subject, a modern golfer, provides a modern twist.

Weinman also taught; among his pupils was Eleanor Mary Mellon.

Selected works

Sculpture
General Alexander Macomb (1906–1908), Detroit, Michigan.
Union Soldiers and Sailors Monument (1909), Wyman Park, Baltimore, Maryland.
Abraham Lincoln (1909), Hodgenville, Kentucky. A replica of this is at the University of Wisconsin–Madison.
Alexander Johnston Cassatt, (1910), Pennsylvania Station, New York City.
Abraham Lincoln (1911), Kentucky State Capitol, Frankfort, Kentucky.
William Cotter Maybury Memorial (1912), Grand Circus Park, Detroit, Michigan.
Rising Sun (1914–15), Panama–Pacific International Exposition, San Francisco, California.
Descending Night (1914–15) (model, Audrey Munson), Panama–Pacific International Exposition, San Francisco, California.
Samuel Rea (1926), Pennsylvania Station, New York City.
Fountain of the Centaurs (ca. 1926), Missouri State Capitol, Jefferson City, Missouri.
Pair of Lions (1929–30), Baltimore Museum of Art, Baltimore, Maryland.
Dewitt Clinton (1941) and Alexander Hamilton (1941), Museum of the City of New York, New York City.
Riders of the Dawn (ca. 1942), Brookgreen Gardens, Murrell's Inlet, South Carolina.

Architectural sculpture
Architectural sculpture (1903–04), Pennsylvania Station, McKim, Mead and White, architects, (demolished 1964). Salvaged pieces of statuary survive in multiple locations.
Architectural sculpture (1904–1906), Madison Square Presbyterian Church, New York City, McKim, Mead and White, architects, (demolished 1919).
Architectural sculpture (1908), Prison Ship Martyrs' Monument, Fort Greene Park, Brooklyn, New York City, McKim, Mead and White, architects.
Masonic Sphinxes: Power and Wisdom (1911–1915), House of the Temple, Washington, D.C., John Russell Pope, architect.
Architectural sculpture (1913–1915), Manhattan Municipal Building, New York City, McKim, Mead and White, architects.
Bronze doors (1921–1923), American Academy of Arts and Letters administration building, West 155th Street, Audubon Terrace, Manhattan, New York City.
Architectural sculpture (1924–1926), Elks National Veterans Memorial, Chicago, Illinois.
Architectural sculpture: South Pediment (ca. 1926), Missouri State Capitol, Jefferson City, Missouri.
Architectural sculpture: Destiny Pediment (1935), National Archives Building, Washington, D.C.
Drafting the Declaration of Independence (1939–1943), pedimental sculpture honoring the Committee of Five on the Jefferson Memorial, Washington, D.C.

U.S. coins and medals
Mercury dime (1916–1945). More than two billion Mercury dimes were minted before it was replaced by the Roosevelt dime in 1946.  The design is now used as the obverse of the American Palladium Eagle coin, which has been produced since 2017.
Walking Liberty half dollar (1916–1947). Replaced by the Franklin half dollar (1948). Weinman's carving is now used as the obverse of the American Silver Eagle coin, which has been produced since 1986.
 J. Sanford Saltus Medal Award – awarded by the American Numismatic Society. Weinman was the second recipient of this medal.

References
Notes

Bibliography
 Kvaran and Lockley, A Guide to the Architectural Sculpture of America, unpublished manuscript

External links

 
Adolph A. Weinman Papers at the Smithsonian Archives of American Art
Artist page at the Metropolitan Museum of Art
Adolph Weinman - Master Engraver
A.A. Weinman (1870-1952) at the R. W. Norton Art Gallery
 

1870 births
1952 deaths
Artists from Karlsruhe
German emigrants to the United States
American architectural sculptors
American male sculptors
Art Students League of New York alumni
20th-century American sculptors
20th-century American male artists
National Sculpture Society members
Sculptors from New York (state)
American currency designers
Coin designers
Olympic competitors in art competitions